Cardiff International School Dhaka is an English-medium school in Dhaka, Bangladesh that has classes from playgroup to A-Level. The school has a "honesty shop", that sells stationary but does not have shopkeepers.

References

Schools in Dhaka District